In mathematics, the super-logarithm is one of the two inverse functions of tetration. Just as exponentiation has two inverse functions, roots and logarithms, tetration has two inverse functions, super-roots and super-logarithms. There are several ways of interpreting super-logarithms:

 As the Abel function of exponential functions,
 As the inverse function of tetration with respect to the height,
 As a generalization of Robert Munafo's large number class system,

For positive integer values, the super-logarithm with base-e is equivalent to the number of times a logarithm must be iterated to get to 1 (the Iterated logarithm). However, this is not true for negative values and so cannot be considered a full definition.
The precise definition of the super-logarithm depends on a precise definition of non-integral tetration (that is,  for y not an integer). There is no clear consensus on the definition of non-integral tetration and so there is likewise no clear consensus on the super-logarithm for non-integer inputs.

Definitions
The super-logarithm, written  is defined implicitly by

 and

This definition implies that the super-logarithm can only have integer outputs, and that it is only defined for inputs of the form  and so on. In order to extend the domain of the super-logarithm from this sparse set to the real numbers, several approaches have been pursued. These usually include a third requirement in addition to those listed above, which vary from author to author. These approaches are as follows:

 The linear approximation approach by Rubstov and Romerio,
 The quadratic approximation approach by Andrew Robbins,
 The regular Abel function approach by George Szekeres,
 The iterative functional approach by Peter Walker, and
 The natural matrix approach by Peter Walker, and later generalized by Andrew Robbins.

Approximations 
Usually, the special functions are defined not only for the real values of argument(s), but to complex plane, and differential and/or integral representation, as well as expansions in convergent and asymptotic series. Yet, no such representations are available for the slog function. Nevertheless, the simple approximations below are suggested.

Linear approximation
The linear approximation to the super-logarithm is:

which is a piecewise-defined function with a linear "critical piece". This function has the property that it is continuous for all real z ( continuous). The first authors to recognize this approximation were Rubstov and Romerio, although it is not in their paper - now 404 - , it can be found in their algorithm likewise 404 - that is used in their software prototype. The linear approximation to tetration, on the other hand, had been known before, for example by Ioannis Galidakis. This is a natural inverse of the linear approximation to tetration.

Authors like Holmes recognize that the super-logarithm would be a great use to the next evolution of computer floating-point arithmetic, but for this purpose, the function need not be infinitely differentiable. Thus, for the purpose of representing large numbers, the linear approximation approach provides enough continuity ( continuity) to ensure that all real numbers can be represented on a super-logarithmic scale.

Quadratic approximation
The quadratic approximation to the super-logarithm is:

which is a piecewise-defined function with a quadratic "critical piece". This function has the property that it is continuous and differentiable for all real z ( continuous). The first author to publish this approximation was Andrew Robbins in this paper.

This version of the super-logarithm allows for basic calculus operations to be performed on the super-logarithm, without requiring a large amount of solving beforehand. Using this method, basic investigation of the properties of the super-logarithm and tetration can be performed with a small amount of computational overhead.

Approaches to the Abel function 

The Abel function is any function that satisfies Abel's functional equation:

Given an Abel function  another solution can be obtained by adding any constant .

Properties
Other equations that the super-logarithm satisfies are:

 for all real z

Probably the first example of a mathematical problem where the solution is expressed in terms of super-logarithms, is the following:
 Consider oriented graphs with N nodes and such that oriented path from node i to node j exists if and only if  If length of all such paths is at most k edges, then the minimum possible total number of edges is:
  for 
  for 
  for 
(M. I. Grinchuk, 1986; cases  require super-super-logarithms, super-super-super-logarithms etc.)

Super-logarithm as inverse of tetration

Behavior of
, defined in such a way, the complex  plane is sketched in Figure 1 for the case . Levels of integer values of real and integer values of imaginary parts of the slog functions are shown with thick lines.
If the existence and uniqueness of the analytic extension of tetration is provided by the condition of its asymptotic approach to the fixed points
 and

of 
in the upper and lower parts of the complex plane, then the inverse function should also be unique.
Such a function is real at the real axis. It has two branch points at
  and
. It approaches its limiting value  in vicinity of the negative part of the real axis (all the strip between the cuts shown with pink lines in the figure), and slowly grows up along the positive
direction of the real axis.
As the derivative at the real axis is positive, the imaginary part of slog remains positive just above the real axis and negative just below the real axis.
The existence, uniqueness and generalizations are under discussion.

See also
 Iterated logarithm
 Tetration

References

 Ioannis Galidakis, Mathematics, published online (accessed Nov 2007).
 W. Neville Holmes, Composite Arithmetic: Proposal for a New Standard, IEEE Computer Society Press, vol. 30, no. 3, pp. 65–73, 1997.
 Robert Munafo, Large Numbers at MROB, published online (accessed Nov 2007).
 C. A. Rubtsov and G. F. Romerio, Ackermann's Function and New Arithmetical Operation, published online (accessed Nov 2007).
 Andrew Robbins, Solving for the Analytic Piecewise Extension of Tetration and the Super-logarithm, published online (accessed Nov 2007).
 George Szekeres,   Abel's equation and regular growth: variations on a theme by Abel, Experiment. Math. Volume 7, Issue 2 (1998), 85-100.
 Peter Walker, Infinitely Differentiable Generalized Logarithmic and Exponential Functions, Mathematics of Computation, Vol. 57, No. 196 (Oct., 1991), pp. 723–733.

External links
 Rubstov and Romerio, Hyper-operations Thread 1
 Rubstov and Romerio, Hyper-operations Thread 2

Logarithms

Süper logaritma